The Oak Ridge Boys Have Arrived is the third country studio album by The Oak Ridge Boys, released in 1979.

"Leaving Louisiana in the Broad Daylight" was previously recorded by co-writer Rodney Crowell in 1978 (Ain't Living Long Like This), and by Emmylou Harris in 1978 (Quarter Moon in a Ten Cent Town). "Dancing the Night Away" was previously recorded by the Amazing Rhythm Aces in 1976 (Too Stuffed to Jump), Tanya Tucker in 1977 (Ridin' Rainbows) and by Leo Sayer in 1978 (Leo Sayer).

Track listing

Personnel

The Oak Ridge Boys
Duane Allen - lead vocals
Joe Bonsall - tenor vocals
William Lee Golden - baritone vocals
Richard Sterban - bass vocals

Additional musicians
Jimmy Capps, Jerry Shook, Chip Young - acoustic guitar
Bobby Thompson - banjo
Joe Osborn - bass guitar
Kenny Buttrey - drums
Reggie Young - electric guitar
Buddy Spicher - fiddle
Roger Bissell, Dennis Good, Bill Puett, Don Sheffield, George Tidwell - horns
Ron Oates - keyboards
George Binkley, Marvin Chantry, Roy Christensen, Carl Gorodetzky, Lennie Haight, Sheldon Kurland, Martha McCrory, Steven Smith, Gary Vanosdale, Pamela Vanosdale, Samuel Terranova, Stephanie Woolf - strings
Bergen White - string and horn arrangements

Charts

Weekly charts

Year-end charts

Singles
Sail Away
Dream On
Leaving Louisiana in the Broad Daylight

References

The Oak Ridge Boys albums
1979 albums
MCA Records albums
Albums produced by Ron Chancey